Parachydaeopsis shaanxiensis is a species of beetle in the family Cerambycidae. It was described by Wang and Chiang in 2002.

References

Acanthocinini
Beetles described in 2002